Namjeju County (Namjeju-gun; "South Jeju County") was a county in Jeju Province, South Korea until July 1, 2006 when it was merged with Seogwipo City.

External links 
 County government website

Seogwipo
Jeju Province
╋